Soul Meeting is the sixth album by saxophonist King Curtis and was released on the Prestige label in 1960 as 7222 and PRLP 7222. It features performances by Curtis, Nat Adderley, Wynton Kelly, Sam Jones, Paul Chambers, Belton Evans, and Oliver Jackson.

Track listing

All compositions by King Curtis, except where noted.

 "Soul Meeting" – 7:01
 "Lazy Soul" – 7:14
 "All the Way" (Jimmy Van Heusen, Sammy Cahn) – 5:30
 "Jeep's Blues" (Duke Ellington, Johnny Hodges) – 6:55
 "What Is This Thing Called Love?" (Cole Porter) – 5:42
 "Do You Have Soul Now?" – 6:25

Personnel
Sources:

Musicians
 King Curtis – tenor saxophone
 Nat Adderley – trumpet, cornet
 Wynton Kelly – piano
 Sam Jones – bass
 Paul Chambers – bass
 Belton Evans – drums
 Oliver Jackson – drums

Technical
 Esmond Edwards – photography
 Don Schlitten – cover design
 Rudy Van Gelder – recording

References

1960 albums
King Curtis albums
Prestige Records albums
Albums produced by Esmond Edwards
Albums produced by Ozzie Cadena
Albums recorded at Van Gelder Studio